Doreen Sloane (24 February 1934, in Birkenhead – 8 April 1990, in Liverpool) was an English actress, best known for playing Annabelle Collins, one of the original characters in the soap opera Brookside on Channel 4 between 1982 and 1990.

She trained at the Elliott Clarke Theatre School in Liverpool and appeared in repertory theatres before being cast in the first of four roles in Coronation Street.

Sloane also appeared in the films Yanks and Chariots of Fire. Other TV appearances include Nearest and Dearest, Last of the Summer Wine , How We Used To Live and in the soap opera Emmerdale.

She died of cancer at the age of only 56. The final scenes she recorded for Brookside went to air after her death.

External links

People from Birkenhead
Deaths from cancer in England
English soap opera actresses
English television actresses
English film actresses
1934 births
1990 deaths
20th-century English actresses
20th-century British businesspeople